The Nordwestdeutsche Philharmonie (North West German Philharmonic) is a German symphony orchestra based in Herford. It was founded in 1950 and, along with Philharmonie Südwestfalen and Landesjugendorchester NRW, is one of the 'official' orchestras (Landesorchester) of the state of North Rhine-Westphalia. The orchestra has been shaped by conductors such as Wilhelm Schüchter, Hermann Scherchen and Andris Nelsons. They have regularly served several cities in northwest Germany, and toured internationally to halls such as Berliner Philharmonie, Tonhalle Zürich and Großes Festspielhaus in Salzburg, also to the U.S. and Japan.

In 1995, they played the premiere recording of Shostakovich's unfinished opera Die Spieler (The Gamblers), sung in Russian by soloists of the Bolshoi Theatre conducted by Michail Jurowski. They were the orchestra for the project Der Ring in Minden, concluded in 2019. Jonathon Heyward has been chief conductor from 2021.

History

A predecessor of the Nordwestdeutsche Philharmonie was founded in 1946 under this name in Bad Pyrmont by members of the former Linzer Reichs-Bruckner-Orchester and the Prager Deutsche Philharmonie. In 1950 this orchestra merged with the Herforder Sinfonisches Orchester. The new orchestra was first named Städtebund-Symphoniker, but in 1951 Nordwestdeutsche Philharmonie.

Funding

The orchestra is funded partly by the state of North Rhine-Westphalia and an association of communities in the region Ostwestfalen-Lippe. Members of the association are the cities Bad Salzuflen, Bünde, Detmold, Herford, Lemgo, Minden and Paderborn and the districts Herford und Lippe. Venues include the Konzerthalle Bad Salzuflen and the Stadttheater Minden.

Activities

The 78 musicians play about 120 concerts per year, mainly in the cities which support the orchestra, but also on international tours to the United States and Japan, among others. They have played in concert halls such as the Berliner Philharmonie, Konzerthaus Dortmund and Großes Festspielhaus in Salzburg.

The orchestra collaborates with the public radio station WDR3. They recorded more than 200 records and CDs. The orchestra has accompanied singers such as Anna Netrebko, José Cura, Plácido Domingo, Luciano Pavarotti und Renée Fleming. The players are engaged in pedagogical programs for schools and young listeners, reaching more than 12,000 children a year.

The orchestra conducts an international summer academy, in 2010 with Fabio Bidini.

Conductors
Conductors included:

1950–1952: Rolf Agop
1952–1953: Eugen Pabst
1953–1955: Wilhelm Schüchter
1955–1956: Albert Grünes
1956–1961: Kurt Brass
1959–1960: Hermann Scherchen
1961–1963: Hermann Hildebrand
1963–1969: Richard Kraus
1969–1971: Werner Andreas Albert
1971–1974: Erich Bergel
1975–1987: János Kulka
1987–1991: Alun Francis
1992–1998: Michail Jurowski
1998–2006: Toshiyuki Kamioka
2006–2009: Andris Nelsons
2010–2014: Eugene Tzigane
2014–2020: Yves Abel
from 2021: Jonathon Heyward

Music

Wilhelm Schüchter conducted in 1955 a recording of Smetana's opera The Bartered Bride performed in German, with the Nordwestdeutsche Philharmonie, the chorus of the Landestheater Hannover, Erna Berger, Rudolf Schock, Gottlob Frick, Hanns-Heinz Nissen, Christa Ludwig, Theodor Schlott and Marga Höffgen.

In 1960, Hermann Scherchen recorded works of Max Reger with alto Margarethe Bence and the Nordwestdeutsche Philharmonie, including Eine Lustspielouvertüre (Comedy Overture), Serenade for orchestra, Eine romantische Suite, "An die Hoffnung", Variations and Fugue on a Theme of Beethoven and Variations and Fugue on a Theme of Mozart.

Werner Andreas Albert conducted the orchestra in a recording of Robert Volkmann's orchestral works, two ouvertures, two symphonies and a cello concerto with soloist Johannes Wohlmacher.

The orchestra, conducted by Erich Bergel, accompanied pianist Volker Banfield on a recording of Les Djinns, a symphonic poem for piano and orchestra by César Franck.

János Kulka conducted the orchestra for a recording of works by Franz Liszt, Hungarian Rhapsody No. 6, Two Episodes of Lenau's Faust and Hunnenschlacht.

Alun Francis conducted a recording of Carl Reinecke's four piano concertos with pianist Klaus Hellwig.

Conducted by Michail Jurowski, they played in 1995 the premiere recording of Shostakovich's unfinished opera Die Spieler (The Gamblers) after Nikolai Gogol, completed by Krzysztof Meyer in 1981, sung in Russian by soloists of the Bolshoi Theatre.

Toshiyuki Kamioka conducted Rautavaara's Symphony No.7 "Angel of Light" in January 2000 in Detmold, Paderborn, Herford, Bad Salzuflen and Minden.

Max Reger's monumental Der 100. Psalm was performed in the Reinoldikirche in Dortmund as part of the Max-Reger-Wochen 2004 in a collaboration with four choirs: Chor der Hochschule für Musik Herford, Westfälische Kantorei, Münsterchor Herford, and Chor des Städtischen Musikvereins Hamm.

In 2004 Britten's War Requiem was performed in the Mainz Cathedral in a collaboration with Joshard Daus and the EuropaChorAkademie.

In August 2006 Frank Beermann conducted Mahler's Resurrection Symphony with the Nordwestdeutsche Philharmonie and the Philharmonische Chöre Siegen und Brühl in the Alfred-Fischer-Halle in Hamm.

In November 2006 the Nordwestdeutsche Philharmonie, conducted by Andreas Delfs, accompanied Renée Fleming in the Berlin Philharmonie. With the EuropaChorAkademie the orchestra played there Poulenc's Stabat Mater and Bruckner's Mass in F minor.

Andris Nelsons conducted Bartók's Viola Concerto, with soloist Hermann Menninghaus, and Mahler's Fifth Symphony in Herford in the final concert with his orchestra in May 2009.

A program of orchestral Lieder and works of Hans Pfitzner and Richard Strauss with baritone Hans Christoph Begermann and conductor Otto Tausk was also performed in Witten.

Eugene Tzigane conducted two concerts in the Tonhalle Zürich, works by Dvořák and Tschaikovsky on 3 May 2010, and Weber's ouverture to Der Freischütz, Mozart's Clarinet concerto with Sebastian Manz, and Beethoven's Symphony No. 7 on 4 May 2010. Tzigane conducted the concerts marking the orchestra's 60th anniversary in October 2010, Don Juan of Richard Strauss, the Violin Concerto of Erich Korngold, with soloist Philippe Quint, and the Symphony in D minor of César Franck.

In November 2010 the orchestra took part in a performance in the Berlin Philharmonie of Hans Krása's: Die Erde ist des Herrn... and Ein deutsches Requiem by Brahms.

In 2017, Dirk Kaftan conducted the first series of concerts, performing Alban Berg's Violin Concerto with Liza Ferschtman as soloist, and Bruckner's Fourth Symphony at seven locations, including Hamm and Marburg.

In the 2020/21 season, the orchestra had to play short concerts with small groups of players, due to the COVID-19 pandemic. Yves Abel conducted a program of Barber's Adagio for Strings, Mendelssohn's Violin Concerto with Anna Tifu as the soloist, and Poulenc's Sinfonietta (Poulenc).

Wagner project in Minden

The orchestra has played in productions of stage works by Richard Wagner, an ongoing project of the Stadttheater Minden on an initiative by Jutta Hering-Winckler, president of the local Richard Wagner Society. The conductor has been Frank Beermann, GMD of the Chemnitz Opera:
2002 Der fliegende Holländer
2005 Tannhäuser
2009 Lohengrin
2012 Tristan und Isolde
2015 to 2019: Der Ring des Nibelungen. The project culminated in Der Ring in Minden, begun in 2015 with annual productions of the four parts, and two complete Ring cycles in 2019.

Throughout the project, the orchestra was positioned at the back of the small stage. After the Ring cycle, a reviewer from the FAZ described the orchestra as "wunderbares Wagnerorchester" (wonderful Wagner orchestra) precisely because it was unfamiliar with Wagner and had to learn every measure. He mentioned its brilliant, glowing and somber colours. and called it the "omniscient narrator and commentator, as well as the source of energy for the action" ("allwissender Erzähler und Kommentator wie Energiequelle des Geschehens").

References

External links
Nordwestdeutsche Philharmonie website (in German)
Entries for the Nordwestdeutsche Philharmonie on WorldCat

German symphony orchestras
Musical groups established in 1950